A Song for Miss Julie is a 1945 American film directed by William Rowland.

Plot summary

Cast 
Shirley Ross as Valerie Kimbro
Barton Hepburn as George Kimbro
Jane Farrar as Julie Charteris
Roger Clark as Stephen Mont
Cheryl Walker as Marcelle Conway
Elisabeth Risdon as Mrs. Ambrose Charteris
Lillian Randolph as Eliza Henry
Peter Garey as Pete – the Bellhop
Renie Riano as Eurydice Lannier
Harry Crocker as John Firbank
Vivien Fay as herself
Alicia Markova as herself – Ballet Dancer
Anton Dolin as himself – Ballet Dancer

Soundtrack

External links 

1945 films
1945 musical films
American black-and-white films
Republic Pictures films
American musical films
1940s English-language films
Films directed by William Rowland
1940s American films